Dolní Krupá is a municipality and village in Mladá Boleslav District in the Central Bohemian Region of the Czech Republic. It has about 300 inhabitants.

Geography
It lies in the Jizera Table.

History
The first written mention of Krupá is from 1229. In 1766 Krupá was divided into two villages, Horní Krupá (today part of Ralsko) and Dolní Krupá. Until the 19th century, the local population made a living from agriculture and forestry, then crafts developed.

Sights
The main landmark of Dolní Krupá is the Church of Saint Wenceslaus. It is a baroque church from the second half of the 18th century.

The baroque rectory next to the church is also a cultural monument. Today it houses a branch of the Museum of the Mladá Boleslav Region.

References

External links

Villages in Mladá Boleslav District